Street Gossip may refer to:
 Street Gossip (Foxx album)
 Street Gossip (mixtape), a mixtape by Lil Baby